Shakedown Street is the area of a jam band parking lot where the vending takes place. It is named after the Grateful Dead song of the same name, and began in the early 1980s in the parking lots at Grateful Dead concerts. Items sold have included food, beverages and alcoholic beverages, clothing (such as T-shirts) and jewelry, among others. Ticket scalping may also occur.

Tailgating
In the Deadhead community, and other like-minded musical scenes, an interesting tailgating culture evolved. More than just a party for fans, it is a way for the faithful to sell wares which in turn fund their tickets and gas to the next concert in order to spend weeks, months, or even entire tours on the road. Along with the more traditional fare and beverages such as individual cans or bottles of beer, there may be a selection of vegetarian food such as grilled cheese sandwiches, egg rolls, burritos, falafel, quesadillas, and pizza. Certain illicit foods such as hash brownies and "ganja gooballs" are also sometimes found in the parking lots. Other products available for the tailgaters include handmade jewelry, bumper stickers, t-shirts, entheogenic agents (“head changes”), or drug paraphernalia.

Socialization
The Shakedown Street vending scene also provides a common area where touring music fans may socialize with one-another while traveling from show to show during a band's concert tour. This can instill a sense of community among fellow touring concert goers.

Concerts with similar vending areas

 The Grateful Dead
 Dark Star Orchestra
 Disco Biscuits
 əkoostik hookah
 Furthur
 Phil Lesh and Friends
 Phish
 Ratdog
 The String Cheese Incident
 Widespread Panic
 Dead & Company
 The Allman Brothers Band

 Billy Strings

In popular culture
Chef Ra purveyed his rasta pasta dish in the Shakedown Street area of parking lots at many Grateful Dead concerts.

References

Further reading
 

Grateful Dead
Drug culture